The Russian route R255 is a federal highway in Russia, part of the Trans-Siberian Highway:  Novosibirsk-(Tomsk-)Kemerovo-Krasnoyarsk-Tayshet-Irkutsk, 1860 km.

Before 2018, the road was designated as M53.

References

Roads in Siberia

ru:Байкал (автодорога)#М53